AAG may refer to:

 Ambrak language, a Torricelli language of Papua New Guinea
 Assistant adjutant general, a military title
 United States Assistant Attorney General, a ranking within the Department of Justice

Business 
 American Advisors Group
 American Airlines Group

Film and television 
Aag (1948 film), a 1948 Bollywood film
Aag (1994 film), a 1994 Bollywood film
 Aag (2007 film), a 2007 Bollywood film
 AAG TV, a Pakistani TV channel

Medicine
 Acute angle closure glaucoma
 alpha-1-acid glycoprotein, also referred to as Orosomucoid (ORM)
 alkyladenine glycosylase; see Deamination
 Autoimmune autonomic ganglionopathy
 AAG, a codon for the amino acid lysine

Organizations
 American Association of Geographers
 Association of Applied Geochemists
 Athletics Association of Guyana

Technology
 AAG (cable system), an undersea cable system linking South East Asia with the United States of America
 Advanced Arresting Gear, an aircraft arresting system

Transportation 
 AAG (1900 automobile), a German automotive company
 AAG (1906 automobile), a German automotive company
 Arapoti Airport, Paraná, Brazil, IATA airport code
 Air Atlantique, ICAO airline designator